Apache Flume is a distributed, reliable, and available software for efficiently collecting, aggregating, and moving large amounts of log data. It has a simple and flexible architecture based on streaming data flows. It is robust and fault tolerant with tunable reliability mechanisms and many failover and recovery mechanisms. It uses a simple extensible data model that allows for online analytic application.

See also

List of Apache Software Foundation projects
 Hortonworks DataFlow

References 

Data mining and machine learning software
Flume
Free software programmed in Java (programming language)
System administration